Greg Quinn may refer to:
 Greg Quinn (farmer)
 Greg Quinn (politician)